Verses for the Dead is a 2018 mystery novel by Douglas Preston and Lincoln Child. This is the eighteenth book in the Special Agent Pendergast series. It tells the story of FBI special agent Aloysius Pendergast as he investigates a serial killer in Miami Beach.

References

External links

American thriller novels

Novels by Douglas Preston
Novels by Lincoln Child
Collaborative novels
Sequel novels
2018 American novels
Grand Central Publishing books